"Don't Worry Bout Me" is a song by Swedish singer Zara Larsson, released by TEN Music Group and Epic Records on 28 March 2019. Larsson wrote "Don't Worry Bout Me" with Tove Lo, Rami Yacoub, Linnea Södahl, Whitney Phillips, and The Struts, who also produced the song. It is a dance-pop track with dancehall-infused house production. Initially released as a standalone single, the song appears on the Japanese edition of Larsson's third studio album, Poster Girl.

Critical reception
Robin Murray of Clash magazine described the track as "electrifying" and "a tour de force of pop energy, backed by a killer chorus and one of Zara's most emphatic vocal performances to date." The Line of Best Fits Cerys Kenneally called it "a sleek summer number".

Charts

Certifications

References

2019 singles
2019 songs
Zara Larsson songs
Epic Records singles
Sony Music singles
Songs written by Tove Lo
Songs written by Rami Yacoub
Songs written by Jakob Jerlström
Songs written by Zara Larsson
Songs written by Ludvig Söderberg
Songs written by Whitney Phillips
Songs written by Linnea Södahl